The Bray Methodist Church is a parish of the Methodist Church in Ireland situated on Eglington Road in Bray, County Wicklow, Ireland.

History 
The church was built in 1864 in Irish Gothic Revival architecture by the Irish architect Alfred Gresham Jones. 

It was built with granite and sandstone material. The main facade has a neo-Gothic arch topped with wooden doors and a rose window in the center ornamented with stained glass. The windows are pointed arch with geometric tracery. The roof, with a gable slope, is topped with slate. The church has a small house-abbey attached with the same architectural style topped by a granite fireplace.

The church is set back behind on the street and surrounded by trees and hedges and a stone wall topped with a wrought iron fence. The temple has two facades, the main façade on Eglington Road and the side façade on Florence Road. Its state of conservation is good.

References

External links 

 Bray Methodist Church

Churches in Bray, County Wicklow
Methodist church buildings in Ireland
Protestant church buildings in the Republic of Ireland